

Busiest ports by cargo tonnage

Busiest container ports

There are a number of other major ports on the Mediterranean and the Baltic with levels of container traffic which would place them in the Top 20 table above, such as Saint Petersburg, Russia, but they are omitted since they are located in countries that do not contribute to the Eurostat statistics from which the table has been produced.

Busiest transshipment ports

Busiest passenger ports

Ranks for 2015

Other large ports in Europe

Albania
Port of Durrës
Port of Vlora

Austria
Vienna
Linz

Belgium
Port of Ghent
Port of Liège - an inland port

Bulgaria
Port of Burgas
Port of Varna

Croatia
Port of Split, the largest passenger port in Croatia
Port of Rijeka, the largest port in Croatia
Port of Ploče, serves mainly Bosnia and Herzegovina
Port of Zadar
Port of Vukovar, the largest river port in Croatia, on Danube river
Port of Osijek, second largest river port in Croatia, on Drava river

Cyprus
Port of Limassol
Port of Larnaca

Denmark
Port of Aarhus
Port of Esbjerg
Port of Copenhagen

Estonia 
Port of Pärnu
Port of Sillamäe

Finland
Port of Helsinki

France
Brest
Caen
Bordeaux
Cherbourg
Dieppe
La Rochelle
Lorient
Lyon
Nantes Saint-Nazaire
Paris
Rouen
Strasbourg
Toulon

Germany
Port of Duisburg-Ruhrort, largest inland port in Europe
Port of Kiel
Port of Rostock
Cologne
Dortmund
Emden
Essen
Frankfurt am Main
Heidelberg
Lübeck
Mannheim
Regensburg
Wiesbaden

Greece
Port of Thessaloniki
Port of Heraklion
Port of Igoumenitsa
Port of Rafina
Port of Patras
Port of Lavrio
Port of Souda
Port of Volos
Port of Eleusina
Port of Agioi Theodoroi
Port of Alexandroupoli
Port of Aspropyrgos
Port of Rhodes
Port of Corfu
Port of Katakolon

Hungary
Budapest

Iceland
Reykjavik

Ireland
Port of Cork
Dublin Port
Rosslare Europort
Shannon Foynes Port
Port of Waterford

Italy
Port of Augusta
Port of Bari
Port of Brindisi
Port of Civitavecchia (Port of Rome)
Port of Cagliari
Port of Livorno
Port of Palermo
Port of Ravenna
Port of Salerno
Port of Savona
Port of Venice

Latvia
Port of Liepāja
Port of Ventspils

Malta
Grand Harbour
Malta Freeport

Montenegro
Port of Bar, which also serves Serbia

The Netherlands

 Groningen Seaports Eemshaven/ Delfzijl 
 Port of Harlingen 
 Port of Nijmegen 
 Zeeland Seaports (Vlissingen/ Terneuzen), together with Ghent (Belgium) part of North Sea Port

Norway
Haugesund
Kristiansand
Narvik
Oslo
Porsgrunn
Stavanger
Tromsø
Trondheim

Poland
Port of Gdynia
Port of Szczecin
Port of Świnoujście
Port of Police
Port of Kołobrzeg

Portugal
Port of Leixões (Porto)
Port of Lisbon

Romania
Port of Brăila
Port of Galați
Port of Mangalia
Port of Midia
Port of Sulina
Port of Tulcea

Russia
Port of Novorossiysk
Port of Primorsk
Port of Saint Petersburg
Archangelsk
Kaliningrad
Murmansk
Sevastopol (disputed)
Volgograd

Serbia
Port of Belgrade

Slovenia
Port of Koper

Spain
Port of A Coruña
Port of Alicante
Port of Almería
Port of Avilés
Port of Bilbao, with 179,572 passengers, cargo of 39,397,938, and 557,355 TEUs in 2008
Port of Cartagena
Port of Cádiz
Port of Castellón
Port of Ceuta
Port of Ferrol
Port of Gijón
Port of Huelva
Port of Málaga, with 642,529 passengers, cargo of 4,620,000 of tons and 428,623 TEUs in 2008
Port of Melilla
Port of Motril
Rota, a large Spanish naval base
Port of Las Palmas (Puerto de la Luz)
Port of Pasajes (Pasaia, Gipuzkoa)
Port of Santander
Port of Santa Cruz de Tenerife, Canary Islands
Port of Seville
Port of Tarragona
Port of Vigo, the biggest fishing port in the world with 751,971 tons of fish and shellfish in 2008

Sweden
Copenhagen Malmö Port (with Denmark)
Port of Trelleborg

Switzerland
Basel on the Rhine River, the only operational inland port in Switzerland

Turkey
 Port of Erdemir
 Port of Filyos
 Port of Güllük
 Port of İzmir
 Port of Mersin
 Port of İskenderun
 Port of Taşucu
 Port of Haydarpaşa
 Port of İstanbul

Ukraine
Port of Chornomorsk
Port of Mariupol
Port of Mykolaiv
Port of Odessa
Pivdennyi Port
Sevastopol (disputed)
Yalta

United Kingdom
Belfast, Northern Ireland
Bristol, Western England
Cardiff, South East Wales
Edinburgh, south-eastern Scotland
Glasgow, south-western Scotland
Kingston upon Hull, north-eastern England
Liverpool, north-western England
Manchester via the Manchester Ship Canal to the Irish Sea
Newcastle upon Tyne, northeastern England
Portsmouth Harbour, southern England is one of the oldest ports in England
Portland Harbour, England
Foyle Port, Northern Ireland

See also
 List of busiest container ports
 List of busiest ports by cargo tonnage

References 

Container terminals
Busiest ports in Europe